Shi Feng (born 1988-11-06 in Liaoyang, Liaoning) is a Chinese swimmer, who competed for China at the 2008 Summer Olympics in Beijing.

Shi Feng reached the semifinals of the men's 100 m butterfly. His semifinal time of 51.68 seconds meant he missed out on a place in the final by 6-hundredths of a second.

Major achievements

2007 National Championships - 1st 100m fly;
2007 National Intercity Games - 1st 100m fly/back

References

1988 births
Living people
Chinese male butterfly swimmers
Swimmers from Liaoning
Olympic swimmers of China
Sportspeople from Liaoyang
Swimmers at the 2008 Summer Olympics
21st-century Chinese people